Miles at the Fillmore – Miles Davis 1970: The Bootleg Series Vol. 3 is a 4 CD live album compiling the four nights of Miles Davis's performances at the Fillmore East in New York City from June 17-20, 1970 and three additional tracks recorded at the Fillmore West two months earlier. The concert series was originally released in part as a double album Miles Davis at Fillmore (Columbia, 1970) but was given the first complete unedited release on this box set.

Reception

Miles at the Fillmore – Miles Davis 1970: The Bootleg Series Vol. 3 received mainly positive reviews on release. At Metacritic, which assigns a normalised rating out of 100 to reviews from mainstream critics, the album has received a score of 92, based on 11 reviews which is categorised as universal acclaim. Thom Jurek's review on AllMusic stated "The charts are loose but focused, and the group's improvisational dynamic is breathtaking, entirely different each night. Davis is exceptionally strong. His playing is inventive, full of questions and muscular statements." PopMatterss Matthew Fiander gave the album 10 out of 10 saying "It was a time of turmoil, but for Davis's music, turmoil was a state of creation, and these four nights give us four distinct and brilliantly built storms." The Guardians John Fordham called the band "controversial and brilliant" and the music "a chapter in the story of 20th-century music as a whole, not just the minutiae of jazz". The Observers Dave Gelly said "It certainly gets close to chaos at times, but these live shows often did. From that point of view at least, it's truly authentic."

Track listing
All compositions by Miles Davis except as indicated

Disc One:
 Introduction – 0:04
 "Directions" (Joe Zawinul) – 10:23
 "The Mask" – 11:04
 "It's About That Time" – 10:44
 "Bitches Brew" – 13:41
 "The Theme" – 0:40
 "Paraphernalia" (Wayne Shorter) – 11:02
 "Footprints" (Shorter) – 11:13 	
Recorded at the Fillmore East in NYC on June 17, 1970 (tracks 1–6) and the Fillmore West in San Francisco, CA on April 11, 1970 (tracks 7 & 8)

Disc Two:
 "Directions" (Zawinul) – 10:10
 "The Mask" – 11:29
 "It's About That Time" – 12:03
 "Bitches Brew" – 11:57
 "The Theme" – 1:29
 "Spanish Key (Encore)" – 10:20
 "The Theme" – 0:27 
Recorded at the Fillmore East in NYC on June 18, 1970 

Disc Three:
 "Directions" (Zawinul) – 12:50
 "The Mask" – 10:00
 "It's About That Time" – 11:27
 "I Fall in Love Too Easily" (Jule Styne, Sammy Cahn) – 1:47 	
 "Sanctuary" (Shorter) – 3:24
 "Bitches Brew" – 12:38
 "The Theme" – 0:44
 "Miles Runs the Voodoo Down" – 13:20 
Recorded at the Fillmore East in NYC on June 19, 1970 (tracks 1–7) and the Fillmore West in San Francisco, CA on April 11, 1970 (track 8)
 
Disc Four:
 "Directions" (Zawinul) – 10:48
 "The Mask" – 11:14
 "It's About That Time" – 11:03
 "I Fall in Love Too Easily" (Styne, Cahn) – 1:20
 "Sanctuary" (Shorter) – 3:20
 "Bitches Brew" – 9:39
 "Willie Nelson" – 9:21
 "The Theme" – 0:37 
Recorded at the Fillmore East in NYC on June 20, 1970

Personnel

 Miles Davis – trumpet with Harmon mute
 Steve Grossman – tenor saxophone, soprano saxophone
 Chick Corea – Fender Rhodes electric piano with delay/fuzz pedals and ring modulator
 Keith Jarrett – Fender Contempo Organ with delay/fuzz pedals + tambourine (Fillmore East tracks only)
 Dave Holland – electric bass guitar with wah-wah pedal
 Jack DeJohnette – drums
 Airto Moreira – cuica, transverse flute, whistle, kazoo, shakers, bells, woodblock, tambourine

Charts

Weekly

Year-end

References

2014 live albums
Miles Davis live albums
Albums produced by Teo Macero
Live at the Fillmore East albums